Mazraat Hraikis is a village in Zgharta District, in the Northern Governorate of Lebanon.

External links
 Ehden Family Tree

Populated places in the North Governorate
Zgharta District
Maronite Christian communities in Lebanon